The Volvo LCP2000 (Light Component Prototype) is a concept car built by Volvo in 1983. It was a project which comprised many engine options for the testing of different fuel types. In this project Volvo experimented with light weight materials to build the engine, such as aluminium, magnesium and plastics. The engineers started work in 1979; they were given a clean sheet to create a car meant for the year 2000, maximizing low fuel consumption. Especially magnesium was used to a large extent; this was a result of Volvo's aborted Norwegian affair (Norway would take forty per cent of the company in return for cash and ten per cent of one of the North Sea oil fields). Norsk Hydro, one of the world's foremost magnesium producers provided the technical know-how. The wheels were developed in collaboration with Campagnolo. The floor plate was a single plastic casting, to which aluminium and magnesium elements were glued. The steering was by Germany's ZF, while Moulton's Hydragas suspension was also installed.

It used many components in aluminium, plastic and even a magnesium engine block. Volvo claimed that only  of "traditional" materials were used. There were two types of three-cylinder turbodiesel engines for this car, one was a magnesium 1.3-liter (1279 cc) powerplant developed together with British diesel specialists Ricardo, pushing  and weighing , and a  cast-iron 1.4-liter Elsbett (ELKO) engine with a KKK turbocharger that could run on a variety of fuels such as low-octane gasoline and sunflower oil (biodiesel). The ELKO engine weighs . A five-speed manual did not provide quite enough gear ratios, so Volvo also used the CVT technology they had received when they purchased DAF. The car's bodywork was of a modular design, which would help offset the greater cost of the exotic materials used.

See also
 http://www.ultimatecarpage.com/car/1894/Volvo-LCP-2000.html

References

LCP2000|Cars